Dr Alexander Morison McAldowie FRSE (1852–1926) was a Scottish physician, folklorist and ornithologist. As an author his topics are diverse, and he wrote in all three fields, being known either as Alex McAldowie or A M McAldowie.

Life
He was born on 16 May 1852 in Aberdeen the son of John McAldowie.
He studied Medicine at Aberdeen University  and graduated MB ChM with highest honours in 1875. He became Assistant Surgeon at Aberdeen Royal Infirmary. He then moved south to England to be House Surgeon at the Royal Surrey County Hospital. Finally he was Consulting Physician at the North Staffordshire Infirmary.

In 1887 he was elected a Fellow of the Royal Society of Edinburgh. His proposers were James Gregg Smith, John Charles Ogilvie Will, Robert Gray and John Gray McKendrick.

He lived most of his later life in Stoke-on-Trent, where he was a leading member of the North Staffordshire Field Club, then one of the largest and most active such societies in the British Isles.

He died on 4 September 1926.

Publications
On Spinal Epilepsy (1878)
Two Cases of Meniere's Disease (1883)
Terebene as a Generator of Ozone (1886)
The Birds of Staffordshire (1893)
Staffordshire Knots: The Book of the Bazaar (1895)
Personal Experiences of Witchcraft (1896)
Prehistoric Time Measurement in Britain (1911)
On the Human Plantar Reflexes.
Pwllheli, a Winter Health Resort.

McAldowie also contributed to the journal Folklore in the 1890s, mainly on the topic of possible survivals of witchcraft superstitions.

References

1852 births
1926 deaths
19th-century Scottish medical doctors
20th-century Scottish medical doctors
Scottish ornithologists
Scottish folklorists
Scottish non-fiction writers
Fellows of the Royal Society of Edinburgh
People from Aberdeen
Alumni of the University of Aberdeen